Kalem railway station is a small railway station in South Goa district, Goa. Its code is KM. It serves Sanguem town. The station consists of one platform. The platform is not well sheltered. It lacks many facilities including water and sanitation.

Major trains 

 Vasco da Gama–Kulem Passenger

References

Hubli railway division
Railway stations in South Goa district